The molecular formula C10H18 may refer to:

 Bornane
 Cyclodecene
 Decalin
 Decynes
 1-Decyne
 2-Decyne
 3-Decyne
 4-Decyne
 5-Decyne, also known as dibutylethyne
 Spirodecane